Pileanthus rubronitidus is a plant species of the family Myrtaceae endemic to Western Australia.

It blooms between  September and November producing red-orange flowers.

It is found on sand plains in the Mid West regions of Western Australia around Northampton where it grows in sandy soils over sandstone.

References

rubronitidus
Plants described in 2002
Taxa named by Gregory John Keighery
Endemic flora of Western Australia